Eric Martínez Vila (born 15 May 1998) is a Spanish basketball player for Bàsquet Girona of the LEB Oro.

Career
A native of Girona, he played for FC Barcelona at the youth level since he was 12 years old. Vila received regular playing time for its reserve team. In December 2014, at age 16, he became the youngest player in club history to play in the Liga ACB.

College career
Vila started playing college basketball in the United States with Texas A&M. After one season, he transferred to Fresno State, sitting out his following year, but did not play for the team. Vila played for Northwest Florida State College in 2018–19 before moving to UTEP as a redshirt junior. He averaged 3.0 points and 5.0 rebounds per game.

Professional career
On 17 July 2021, Vila signed with Bàsquet Girona of the LEB Oro.

National team career
Vila has represented Spain in several international tournaments. In 2014, he helped his team win a bronze medal at the FIBA Europe Under-16 Championship in Latvia. In the 2017 FIBA Under-19 World Cup in Cairo, Vila averaged 13 points, 10.9 rebounds and 2.7 assists per game. At the quarterfinals of the tournament, he recorded 24 points, 11 rebounds and three assists in a 70–58 win over Argentina.

References

External links
UTEP Miners bio
Texas A&M Aggies bio

1998 births
Living people
Bàsquet Girona players
FC Barcelona Bàsquet B players
FC Barcelona Bàsquet players
Northwest Florida State Raiders men's basketball players
Power forwards (basketball)
Spanish expatriate basketball people in the United States
Spanish men's basketball players
Texas A&M Aggies men's basketball players
UTEP Miners men's basketball players